Kalliküla is a village in Valga Parish, Valga County in southeastern Estonia.

Gallery

References

Villages in Valga County